Jock Wilson may refer to:

 Jock Wilson (British Army soldier) (1903–2008), British serviceman and oldest D-Day veteran
 Jock Wilson (Scottish footballer) (1870–?), Scottish footballer
 Jock Wilson (English footballer) (1894–1957), English footballer
 Jock Wilson (police officer) (1922–1993), British police officer

See also 
 John Wilson (disambiguation)